John Hamel Elgood (1909-1998) was British ornithologist.

He was the founder of Nigerian Ornithologists' Society.

Taxon authored: Malimbus ibadanensis.

References

British ornithologists
1909 births
1998 deaths
20th-century British zoologists